The fit-PC3 is a small, light, fan-less nettop computer manufactured by the Israeli company CompuLab.  Several fit-PC3 variations are available - fit-PC3 was introduced early 2012.  The device is power-efficient (about 6 - 18 W) and therefore considered to be a green computing project, capable of using open source software and creating minimal electronic waste.

fit-PC3

The fit-PC3 has been released early 2012, CompuLab fit-PC3 includes:

 APU, (6.4W to 18W):
 AMD G-T44R single core processor @ 1.2Ghz with AMD Radeon HD 6250 Graphics
 AMD G-T40E dual core processor @ 1Ghz with AMD Radeon HD 6250 Graphics
 AMD G-T56N dual core processor @ 1.65Ghz with AMD Radeon HD 6320 Graphics
 Main I/O: AMD Embedded A55E Controller Hub
 Memory: Up to 8GB DDR3-1333 (2 SO-DIMM sockets)
 Display: Dual-head HDMI 1.4 + DisplayPort (G-T40E model has HDMI 1.3a)
 Audio: Digital 7.1 channels S/PDIF, stereo line-out, line-in, mic
 Storage: Internal 2.5" SATA III hard disk, mSATA socket and 2 eSATA ports
 Networking: GbE + 802.11b/g/n Wi-Fi + BT 3
 I/O: 2 USB 3.0 ports + 2 USB 2.0 ports on the back panel + 4 USB 2.0 ports on the front (when using standard FACE Module). RS232.
 Expansion: 2 mini-PCI express sockets. One is usable as mSATA SSD drive with 2.3 board rev., the other is used by Wi-Fi when ordered with Wi-Fi
 Casing: Passively cooled die-cast aluminum 6.3" x 6.3" x 0.98" (16 x 16 x 2.5 cm). Higher wattage units use a ribbed heat sink type chassis.
 Custom extension board, (called FACE Module - Function And Connectivity Extension Module):
 FM-1LAN 1 GbE, 4 USB 2.0 ports, and 2 mini PCIe half sized slots
 FM-4E4U is 4 port GbE with 4 USB 2.0 ports.
 FM-E4U is 1 GbE with 4 USB 2.0 ports.
 FM-2MP has 2 mini-PCIe sockets.
 FM-VC Multiple input video & audio capture, including 2 USB 2.0 ports and serial port
 FM-USB3 has 2 USB3.0 and 2 USB 2.0 ports, plus 1 mSATA SSD storage slot
 FM-POE is Quad LAN + Power over Ethernet, with 4 USB 2.0 ports.
 FM-SER 6 ports supporting RS232 / RS485 / RS422, and 2 CAN bus ports

Model variations

See also
fit-PC
Media PC
Media center (disambiguation)
Nettop
Industrial PC

References

External links
 
 fit-PC3 website
 fit-PC3 Users forum
 fit-PC3 Twitter
 Compulab website

Nettop